Route 535, or Highway 535, may refer to:

Canada
 Alberta Highway 535
 New Brunswick Route 535
 Ontario Highway 535

United Kingdom
 A535 road

United States
 
 
 
 
 
 
 
  (former)
 
  Virginia State Route 535 (1930)